Peter Crouch: Save Our Summer is a British sports comedy panel game show that first aired on BBC One on 6 June 2020. Originally planned as part of the BBC's Euro 2020 coverage, The eight-part television series was announced by the BBC on 24 March 2020 as a response to the widespread cancellation of public activities in sports, music, and comedy amid the spread of COVID-19. 
The programme features Peter Crouch, Maya Jama, and Alex Horne and The Horne Section, and aims to give the British public "a little bit of all the big summer events that have been taken away".

Regular features on the programme include a game of 'VAR' (conducting musical tempo in 'very accurate rhythm' using kick-ups), a guest musician performing a solo 'garden session', and a closing song to "some of the unsung heroes of the last few months".

The show returned in 2021 as Crouchy's Year-Late Euros: Live, acting as it was originally planned, a late-night after show for UEFA Euro 2020.

Transmissions

Episodes

References

External links
 
 

2020s British comedy television series
2020s British game shows
2020 British television series debuts
2020 British television series endings
BBC panel games
BBC television comedy
BBC television game shows
British panel games
COVID-19 pandemic in the United Kingdom
English-language television shows
Television shows about the COVID-19 pandemic